Stonewood is a city in Harrison County, West Virginia, United States. The population was 1,810 at the 2020 census.

The name Stonewood has no special meaning, and was invented for the place.

Geography
Stonewood is located at  (39.252001, -80.309979), along Elk Creek.

Demographics

2010 census
As of the census of 2010, there were 1,806 people, 819 households, and 494 families living in the city. The racial makeup of the city was 95.8% White, 1.8% African American, 0.2% Native American, 0.3% Asian, 0.1% Pacific Islander, 0.1% from other races, and 1.6% from two or more races. Hispanic or Latino of any race were 1.9% of the population.

There were 819 households, of which 23.2% had children under the age of 18 living with them, 42.5% were married couples living together, 12.7% had a female householder with no husband present, 5.1% had a male householder with no wife present, and 39.7% were non-families. 33.8% of all households were made up of individuals, and 14.3% had someone living alone who was 65 years of age or older. The average household size was 2.19 and the average family size was 2.76.

The median age in the city was 45.6 years. 18.2% of residents were under the age of 18; 5.9% were between the ages of 18 and 24; 24.8% were from 25 to 44; 30.8% were from 45 to 64; and 20.3% were 65 years of age or older. The gender makeup of the city was 47.0% male and 53.0% female.

2000 census
As of the census of 2000, there were 1,815 people, 789 households, and 522 families living in the city. The population density was 2,130.8 people per square mile (824.4/km2). There were 855 housing units at an average density of 1,003.8 per square mile (388.4/km2). The racial makeup of the city was 97.80% White, 1.60% African American, 0.11% Native American, 0.06% Asian, and 0.44% from two or more races. Hispanic or Latino of any race were 0.83% of the population.

There were 789 households, out of which 24.1% had children under the age of 18 living with them, 49.3% were married couples living together, 12.9% had a female householder with no husband present, and 33.8% were non-families. 30.0% of all households were made up of individuals, and 14.8% had someone living alone who was 65 years of age or older. The average household size was 2.28 and the average family size was 2.82.

In the city, the age distribution of the population shows 19.1% under the age of 18, 7.2% from 18 to 24, 27.7% from 25 to 44, 25.8% from 45 to 64, and 20.3% who were 65 years of age or older. The median age was 42 years. For every 100 females, there were 90.5 males. For every 100 females age 18 and over, there were 85.0 males.

The median income for a household in the city was $28,000, and the median income for a family was $31,078. Males had a median income of $25,962 versus $25,788 for females. The per capita income for the city was $16,520. About 11.8% of families and 13.3% of the population were below the poverty line, including 22.6% of those under age 18 and 7.3% of those age 65 or over.

References

Cities in West Virginia
Cities in Harrison County, West Virginia
Clarksburg micropolitan area